Barbara Kathleen Snow (born Whitaker; 21 February 1921 in Evershot, Dorset – 2007), was a noted English ornithologist and a trained geologist. She and her husband, David Snow, formed a close team, becoming among the most influential British ornithologists of the 20th century.

Career and personal life

In 1958 Barbara, who had been the Warden of Lundy Island in the Bristol Channel, married David William Snow, a highly renowned British ornithologist, in Trinidad. From 1957 to 1961 the Snows worked for the New York Zoological Society at the society's Tropical Research Centre headed by the famous American naturalist, William Beebe. The centre was later expanded and is now known as the research centre in Trinidad.

Here David Snow began his studies of the oilbirds (Steatornis caripensis), and their echolocation abilities which enabled them to navigate to their nests in complete darkness using high-pitched clicks audible to humans (unlike the echolocation sounds of many bats). Barbara joined him in 1957 and from then on they worked together as a close-knit partnership. He and Barbara also began detailed studies of three bird families, the hummingbirds, the cotingas and the manakins, all associated with plants. This work extended over many years in Central and South America and led to important discoveries on the co-adaption between the birds and plants, providing food for the birds while ensuring the fertilising of the plants' flowers and dispersal of their seeds - "an early breakthrough in the integration of behaviour and ecology."

They focussed for some time on the fascinating and very complex courtship dances of the white-bearded manakin (Manacus manacus) and the golden-headed manakin (Pipra erythrocephala). They came to realise that tropical fruit-eating birds have abundant food resources, and, therefore, a lot of "spare time" which has facilitated the extraordinary flourishing of communal lek displays by male manakins. He described these in several classic papers, while also working with Barbara on other tropical birds.

In 1963, David was invited to become director of the new Charles Darwin Station on the Galápagos Islands. He completed the first real working field station there and set up regular surveying routines. He may have stayed longer, but as he now had a young family to raise, in 1964 he returned to England, following Barbara who had gone ahead to have their second son.

They spent the rest of their careers in Britain. David was appointed Director of Research at the British Trust for Ornithology and later Director of the Natural History Museum's bird room. They moved out to Tring, Hertfordshire, close to their home. He edited the influential ornithological journal, The Ibis for some years and published the valuable two-volume work, Birds of the Western Palaearctic.

At their home and in the neighbouring countryside they continued their studies - particularly of fruit-eating birds "resulting in Birds and Berries, of which Barbara was deservedly the senior author as she had done a good deal more of the field work than I had."

Barbara was survived by David who died two years later. They were survived by their two sons.

"Again, her remarkably acute observation, coupled with endless patience and, perhaps more importantly, delight in the birds around her, from Flightless Cormorants to hummingbirds, enabled her to discover much that could only be discovered by sitting and watching."

Works

 Snow, D.W. & Snow, B.K. (1966). "The breeding season of the Madeiran Storm-petrel (Oceanodromo castro) in the Galapagos." Ibis 108(2):283-284.
 Snow, D.W. & Snow, B.K. (1967). "The breeding cycle of the Swallow-tailed Gull (Creagrus furcatus)." Ibis 109(1):14-24
 Snow, B.K. & Snow, D.W. (1968). "Behavior of the Swallow-tailed Gull of the Galapagos." Condor 70(3):
 Snow, B.K. & Snow, D.W. (1969). "Observations on the Lava Gull (Larus fuliginosus)." Ibis 111(1):30-35
 Snow, B.K. & Snow, D.W. (1971). "The feeding ecology of tanagers and honeycreepers in Trinidad." The Auk 88(2)
 Snow, B.K. & Snow, D.W. (1974). "Breeding of the Green-bellied Hummingbird." The Auk 91(3)
 Snow, B.K. & Snow, D.W. (1979). "The Ochre-bellied Flycatcher and the Evolution of Lek Behavior." Condor 81(3)
 Snow, B.K. & Snow, D.W. (1984). "Long-term defence of fruit by Mistle Thrushes Turdus viscivorus. Ibis 126(1):39-49
 Snow, B.K. & Snow, D.W. (1985). "Display and related behavior of male Pin-tailed Manakins." Wilson Bulletin 97(3):
 Snow, D.W. (1987). The Blackbird, Shire Natural History 
 Snow, B.K. & Snow, D.W. (1988). Birds and berries: a study of an ecological interaction. Poyser, London

Awards
In 1972, Barbara and David were joint recipients of the American Ornithologists' Union's Brewster Medal.

Footnotes

References
 
 Snow, David (2008b). Birds in our Life. William Sessions limited, York. .
 Frank D. Steinheimer: David Snow (1924–2009), Vogelwarte, Band 47, Heft 2, 2009, S. pp. 144–145.
 The Daily Telegraph obituary

Further reading
 Rudder, Joy (2009). The old house and the dream: The story of The Asa Wright Nature Centre. Prospect Press, Maraval, Port of Spain, Trinidad. . Especially pp. 47–49.
 Article on Barbara Snow on the German Wikipedia at: http://de.wikipedia.org/w/index.php?title=Barbara_Kathleen_Snow&action=edit
 Snow, D, W. (2008). Birds in Our Life. William Sessions Limited.  (pbk) An autobiography.
 "David Snow: unrivalled doyen of British ornithology." Sunday Times, February 28, 2009.

English ornithologists
1921 births
2007 deaths
20th-century British zoologists
British expatriates in Trinidad and Tobago